John Brown (23 December 1841 – 1 August 1905) was a Liberal party member of the House of Commons of Canada. He was born in Wentworth County, Canada West and became a miller and mining consultant / prospector by career.

He became the Member of Parliament for Monck following his victory in the 1891 federal election. After several months service in the 7th Parliament, Brown was unseated the following year and replaced by Arthur Boyle in a 12 March 1892 by-election.

External links
 

1841 births
1905 deaths
Liberal Party of Canada MPs
Members of the House of Commons of Canada from Ontario
Politicians from Hamilton, Ontario